Joseph Werth SJ (born October 4, 1952 in Karaganda) is Bishop of Transfiguration in Novosibirsk (Russia).

Named as the Latin Church Apostolic Administrator of Siberia—a see that encompassed 4.2 million square miles (10.3 per cent of all the land on earth) and extends through nine of the world's twenty four time zones—by Pope John Paul II on April 13, 1991, Werth initially had only two Ukrainian-born priests to help him minister to an estimated 500,000 Catholics. He has since assembled over 100 priests, nuns and lay missionaries from 18 different countries, mostly from Poland, Germany, and Slovakia, but also Nicaragua, Lebanon, India, Argentina, South Korea, and other countries. At least fourteen are from the United States.

The Apostolic Administration of Siberia was divided in 1999 into the Apostolic Administrations of Eastern and of Western Siberia, and the Apostolic Administration of Western Siberia was elevated in 2002 to the rank of a diocese, the Diocese of Transfiguration in Novosibirsk.
The center of his diocese is at Novosibirsk, the capital of Siberia, where the cathedral stands. He has sent church workers to the largest cities of Siberia, as well as many towns with sizeable Catholic populations.

Joseph Werth began studies for the priesthood clandestinely in Lithuania under the direction of a leader of the underground Jesuits, who also secretly accepted him into the Lithuanian Province of the Society of Jesus. Later he completed his studies at the  seminary in Kaunas. In 1984 Father Werth became the first Roman Catholic priest ordained since the 1930s in the Asian part of the former Soviet Union.

He pursued pastoral work at Aktyubinsk, Kazakhstan from 1984 till 1988. He was reportedly so successful in his ministry at Aktyubinsk that the local communist officials expelled him from the city in 1988. 

In 1988 he moved to Marx in Russia's Saratov oblast, where two of his own sisters (both Sisters of the Blessed Sacrament) had organized about thirty Catholic congregations among the thousands of ethnic Germans who, following the death of Stalin, had returned to the area of the former Volga German Republic. He served there until 1991.

In December 2004, the Congregation for the Eastern Churches appointed him as Ordinary for Catholics of the Byzantine rite in the Russian Federation- that is, for Catholics who use the same liturgical rite as the Russian Orthodox Church, as well as for immigrants from Ukraine, practicing the rite of the Ukrainian Greek Catholic Church.

Bishop Werth is fluent in Russian, German, and Lithuanian.

Family
The Bishop's paternal grandfather was Joseph Werth, who was born in 1871 at Schoenchen , Russian Empire and deported as a kulak to Kazakhstan in 1929 (with his wife and children). He died in 1951. The Bishop's paternal grandmother was Paulina Demund (b. 1881, Schoenchen - d. 1933). The Bishop's maternal grandfather was Dominic Hoerner (born near Odessa, Ukraine), who was deported around 1931 to Kazakhstan with his family. Joseph and Paulina Werth (and their son Johannes) were part of a trainload of 30000 ethnic Germans gathered up during the collectivization and dumped in the middle of the Kazakhstan steppe in the middle of winter of 1929.

Those who survived did so by digging holes in the earth. By the time the next load arrived, 12,000 had died. This area is now the city of Karaganda, where on October 4, 1952, Msgr. Werth was born. He was the second of eleven children born to Johannes Werth (born October 1, 1923 in Schoenchen, Russian Empire - died November 18, 1995 in Ilbenstadt, near Frankfurt, Germany) and Maria Hoerner Werth (born December 23, 1931, near Odessa, Ukraine).

References

External links
Diocese of Novosibirsk (in Russian)
Werth Biography
US Conference of Catholic Bishops/Russia
US Conference of Catholic Bishops archives
Summit on religion

1952 births
Living people
Russian people of German descent
Russian Jesuits
21st-century Roman Catholic bishops in Russia
Kazakhstani Roman Catholics
People from Karaganda
People from Novosibirsk
Kazakhstani people of German descent
Officers Crosses of the Order of Merit of the Federal Republic of Germany
Jesuit bishops